MNTV may refer to:
Multiple non-transferable vote, also known as plurality-at-large voting, an electoral system
MyNetworkTV, a broadcast syndication service in the United States